Merrimac State High School is a public high school in Mermaid Waters, Queensland which opened in 1979.

Notable alumni
Marcus Ashcroft, Australian rules football
Steven McLuckie, Australian rules football
Ricky Petterd, Australian rules football
Grant Hackett, swimming

References

Educational institutions established in 1979
Public high schools in Queensland
Schools on the Gold Coast, Queensland
1979 establishments in Australia